Peter Laurence Taylor (born 22 August 1956) is a former Australian cricketer who played in 13 Test matches and 83 One Day Internationals between 1987 and 1992. He became a Test match selector for Australia in the late 1990s.

Domestic career
His initial selection for Australia in 1986–87 came after only a handful of games for NSW was a huge shock. It was initially thought that his more known New South Wales colleague Mark Taylor had been selected. He was dubbed Peter Who? by the media. Taylor played for New South Wales in the Sheffield Shield between 1985 and 1990 and played two seasons for Queensland (1990–92)

International career
He justified his selection with a stunning 6/78 on debut against England at Sydney. He however was unable to repeat such a feat again in his test career (12 more matches between 1987 and 1992).

However Taylor became the staple spin-bowler of the Australian One Day team of the late 1980s and early 1990s. He was able to bowl his off-spin with economy and pick up vital wickets in matches. He was also a good fielder and an able lower order batsman. He played 83 times taking 97 wickets between 1987 and 1992, appearing in both the 1987 and the 1992 World Cups.

Taylor was noted for his deliberate approach to the wicket and the rhythmical nature of his bowling action that involved him first swinging his bowling arm, joining hands as he swung forwards then completing a loop of his joined hands before delivering the ball. He was noted as a heavy spinner of a cricket ball and comparisons were made with Ashley Mallett, also a former Australian spin bowler.

References

Notes

External links
 Ashes One-hit wonders – The Guardian 2005

Australian cricketers
1956 births
Living people
Australia Test cricketers
Cricketers who have taken five wickets on Test debut
Australia One Day International cricketers
Cricketers at the 1987 Cricket World Cup
Cricketers at the 1992 Cricket World Cup
New South Wales cricketers
Queensland cricketers
People educated at Barker College